John Nicholas may refer to:

John Nicholas (academic), English academic administrator at the University of Oxford
John Nicholas (congressman) (1764–1819), American politician
John Nicholas (footballer) (1879–1929), British footballer
John Nicholas (ice hockey) (1930–1966), Australian ice hockey player
Johnny Nicholas (born 1948), blues musician
John Nicholas (judge), judge of the Federal Court of Australia
John Nicholas (Devizes MP) (1691–1746), Member of Parliament (MP) for Devizes 1713–1715

Sir John Nicholas (1624–1705), MP for Ripon 1661–1679, for Wilton (also elected for Wilton and West Looe in 1661)
John Nicholas (of Chepstow), English soldier and politician

See also